Albert County (2016 population 29,158) is New Brunswick's third-youngest county located on the Western side of the Petitcodiac River on the Chignecto Bay in the Bay of Fundy. Prior to the abolition of county government in 1967, the shire town was Hopewell Cape. The county was established in 1845 from parts of Westmorland County and Saint John County, and named after Prince Albert.

The mineral albertite was discovered a few miles away in 1849, giving rise to Albert Mines.

Census subdivisions

Communities
There are four municipalities within Albert County (listed by 2016 population):

Parishes
The county is subdivided into six parishes (listed by 2016 population):

note 2016 population of the Village of Alma

Demographics

Language

Access Routes
Highways and numbered routes that run through the county, including external routes that start or finish at the county limits:

Highways
None

Principal Routes

Secondary Routes:

External Routes:
None

Protected areas and attractions

 Fundy National Park
Chignecto North
Headquarters
Point Wolfe
Visitors Centre
 Hopewell Rocks
 McManus Hill Natural Protected Area
 Shepody National Wildlife Area
 Wilson Brook Natural Protected Area
 Cape Enrage
 Albert County Museum

Notable people

See also
List of communities in New Brunswick

References

External links
Albert County Guide

 
Counties of New Brunswick